In 2004 a new postal code system was introduced in Iraq.

Iraqi Post has developed a comprehensive Postal Code numbering system that will ensure more efficient mail sorting and accuracy of delivery of your correspondence. The new postal system was rededicated in 2004. The system is numeric and utilizes five digits that correspond to the Region, governorate as well as the post office within that governorate.

Mail Address Format:
Examples:

Recipients Name

Company Name (if any)

PO Box # or Street Address

City*, Province

Postal Code

Codes by governorates

See also
 List of postal codes in Iraq

Iraq
Postal system of Iraq